The 2003 European Fencing Championships were held in Bourges, France. The event took place from 29 June to 3 July 2003.

Medal summary

Men's events

Women's events

Medal table

References 
 Results at the European Fencing Confederation

2003
European Fencing Championships
European Fencing Championships
European Fencing Championships
European Fencing Championships
Bourges
International fencing competitions hosted by France